Burbuja (Spanish "bubble") or Burbujas may refer to:

Music
Burbujas, Mexican album for kids released in 1979
"Burbujas", tango by Astor Piazzolla
"Burbuja", song by Si*Sé from Si*Sé
"Burbuja", song by David Bisbal from Tú y Yo

Other
Burbuja, 1967 TV series with Juan Carlos Altavista 
Burbujas, 2009 comic book by Daniel Torres

See also
"Burbujas de Amor" ("Bubbles of Love") by Juan Luis Guerra 1990